Tom Bordeaux (born February 19, 1954) is an American politician who served in the Georgia House of Representatives from 1991 to 2007.  He served as chairman of the House Judiciary Committee for several years until his mid-session removal by Speaker Terry Coleman in 2004 following disputes over bills concerning tort reform and child endangerment.

References

1954 births
Living people
Democratic Party members of the Georgia House of Representatives